Maroš is a male given name which is a modern Slovak nickname derived from Marek and Marian. It is pronounced mah-row:sh. Notable people with the name include:
Maroš Balko, Slovak footballer
Maroš Ferenc, Slovak footballer
Maroš Kramár, Slovak actor
Maroš Klimpl, Slovak footballer
Maroš Kondrót, Congressman of National Counsellar of Slovakia
Maroš Kolpak, Slovak handball player
Maroš Kováč, Slovak cyclist
Maroš Molnár, Slovak track and field athlete
Maroš Tkáč, Slovak water polo player
Maroš Šefčovič, Slovak diplomat
Maroš Žemba, Slovak ice hockey player

Masculine given names
Slovak masculine given names